Thomas James Lysiak (April 22, 1953 – May 30, 2016) was a Canadian professional ice hockey player. Selected in the first round, second overall, of the 1973 NHL Amateur Draft by the Atlanta Flames, he was additionally selected by the Houston Aeros in the second round of the 1973 WHA Amateur Draft at 23rd overall.

In each of his last two seasons with the Medicine Hat Tigers, Lysiak was awarded the Bob Clarke Trophy as the Western Canadian Hockey League's leading scorer, with a total of 297 points in 135 games.

Playing career
Lysiak joined the Flames for the 1973–74 NHL season, the second year for the franchise, and scored a team-high 64 points. He helped the team to its first playoff berth and finished second in the voting for the Calder Memorial Trophy (top rookie).

Lysiak led the Flames in scoring in each of his five full seasons with the team and represented the Flames in three consecutive NHL All-Star Games, in 1975, 1976 and 1977. He served as the Flames' team captain during the 1977–78 and 1978–79 seasons, but he was traded to the Chicago Black Hawks in an unpopular multiplayer deal midway through the 1978–79 season. Eight players were involved in the trade, the biggest trade numbers-wise in NHL history at the time. He is the Atlanta Flames' all-time leader for assists with 276 and points with 431 and ranks second in goals with 155. He had 21 two-goal games with the Flames and one hat trick.

Lysiak played seven full seasons for Chicago and in 1980–81 led the team in scoring with 76 points, including a career-high 55 assists. The next season, 1981–82, he matched his top point-scoring season in Atlanta with 82 points and scored a career-high 32 goals.

On October 30, 1983, while a member of the Black Hawks, Lysiak tripped linesman Ron Foyt during a game against the Hartford Whalers. For the incident, the NHL imposed a 20-game suspension, one of the longest in league history.

Personal life
After his retirement, Lysiak worked in the landscaping, real estate and construction industries in the Atlanta area.

In 2012, Lysiak was inducted into the National Polish-American Sports Hall of Fame.

His daughter Jessica competed on Season 4 of the US version of MasterChef in 2013, finishing in 3rd place. She is married to Philadelphia Flyers defenseman Justin Braun.

Lysiak died of leukemia in Atlanta, Georgia on May 30, 2016 at age 63, three years after he had been diagnosed with the disease in May 2013. He is related to Colorado Avalanche defenceman Cale Makar, as his cousin Gary is Makar’s father.

Career statistics

Regular season and playoffs

International

Awards
Bob Brownridge Memorial Trophy (WCHL leading scorer) - 1972 & 1973
 WCHL First All-Star Team – 1972
 WCHL All-Star Team – 1973

See also
List of Chicago Blackhawks players

References

External links

 1973 NHL Amateur Draft -- Tom Lysiak
 "Lysiak Penalty Upheld." New York Times. 9 December 1983.

1953 births
2016 deaths
American people of Polish descent
Atlanta Flames captains
Atlanta Flames draft picks
Atlanta Flames players
Canadian ice hockey centres
Chicago Blackhawks players
Deaths from cancer in Georgia (U.S. state)
Deaths from leukemia
Houston Aeros draft picks
Ice hockey people from Alberta
Medicine Hat Tigers players
National Hockey League All-Stars
National Hockey League first-round draft picks
People from Big Lakes County